Świnoujście (all three meaning "Świna [river] mouth") is a city in Western Pomerania and seaport on the Baltic Sea and Szczecin Lagoon, located in the extreme north-west of Poland. Situated mainly on the islands of Usedom and Wolin, it also occupies smaller islands. The largest is Karsibór island, once part of Usedom, now separated by the Piast Canal, formerly the Kaiserfahrt, dug in the late 19th century to facilitate ship access to Szczecin.

Since 1999, Świnoujście has been a city with powiat rights, within West Pomeranian Voivodeship. It was previously part of Szczecin Voivodeship (1975–1998). The city lies in the geographic region of Pomerania and had a population of 41,516 in 2012. Świnoujście is one of the most important areas of the Szczecin metropolitan area. The Świnoujście LNG terminal, opened in 2015, is located in the city.

Despite its relatively small population, Świnoujście is Poland's ninth-largest city by area.

History 

The first human settlements in areas that are now Świnoujście appeared five thousand years ago, as confirmed by archaeological findings. For a thousand years, the estuary of the river was part of the state of the Świnoujście, included in the emerging Polish state in the 10th century by first Polish ruler Mieszko I.

In the early 12th century, the island became part of the Duchy of Pomerania, founded as a vassal duchy of Poland. In later centuries, local Pomeranian princes ruled the area, and on both sides of the river, they built fortified castles, which were destroyed several times by the Danish invasions in the 12th century, in 1170 and 1173. Between 1185 and 1227, the settlement was part of a Danish fief.

During the Thirty Years' War (1618–1648) the city became part of the Swedish Empire.

The strait Świna was formerly flanked by the fishing villages of Westswine and Ostswine. Towards the beginning of the 17th century, it was made navigable for large ships. The Kingdom of Prussia gained the area in 1720 from Sweden, and included it in her Pomeranian province. Świnoujście (Swinemünde) was founded on the site of Westswine in 1748, fortified, and received town privileges from King Frederick II of Prussia in 1765. It served as the outer port of Stettin (Szczecin) and was administered within the Province of Pomerania. Swinemünde became part of the German Empire after the Kingdom of Prussia completed the unification of Germany in 1871.

The town had broad, unpaved streets and one-story houses built in the Dutch style, which gave it an almost rustic appearance. Its industries, beyond some fishing, were entirely connected with its shipping. The river mouth, which was the entrance to the harbor and regarded as the best on the Prussian Baltic coast, was then protected by two curving long breakwaters, and was strongly fortified. On the island of Wolin, on the other side of the narrow Świna, a great lighthouse was erected. In 1897 the canal of the Kaiserfahrt was opened to navigation, and this waterway between the Stettin harbour and the Baltic Sea was deepened between 1900 and 1901. From then on Stettin could be reached directly by ships, and Swinemünde's importance diminished somewhat.

During World War II, Germany operated a forced labour subcamp of the Stalag II-D prisoner-of-war camp in the city. In February 1945, a German-conducted death march of Allied prisoners of war from the Stalag Luft IV prisoner-of-war camp passed through the city. On 12 March 1945 during World War II, refugee-crowded Swinemünde suffered heavy destruction by the USAAF, an estimated 5,000 to 23,000 were killed, most of whom are buried on the Golm War Cemetery west of the town, on the German side of the border. The city and port were also destroyed during the Allied air raids on 12 March and 16 April 1945. On 16 April 1945, a British heavy bomber of the No. 617 Squadron RAF was shot down by the Germans, and is now commemorated with a memorial on the Karsibór island within the city limits. The unfinished  was scuttled in the harbor in an attempt to prevent its capture by the advancing Red Army (it was nevertheless refloated by the Soviets later). The German battleship  had also participated in the defence of the city, before it too was scuttled. After the German forces defending the city were evacuated, Soviet forces occupied the city on the night of 4–5 May 1945.

After Germany's defeat in the war, the Allied Nations imposed new borders in Central and Eastern Europe at the Potsdam Conference, which made the area, including Świnoujście, again part of Poland, although with a Soviet-installed communist regime, which stayed in power until the Fall of Communism in the 1980s. The entire population was expelled in accordance to the Potsdam Agreement and replaced by ethnic Poles. 
The Treaty of Zgorzelec signed between the People's Republic of Poland and the German Democratic Republic affirmed the new border, and the German–Polish Border Treaty of 1990 officially affirmed the existing borders after the fall of the Iron Curtain.

In the winter of 1945, some members of the communist Polish Security Forces who had been victims of German concentration camps carried out atrocities against local Germans. An investigation in 2008 estimated that over 40 German civilians were killed. Nine men were charged with the murder and maltreatment of Germans, and in 1947, after one escaped and one hanged himself, seven of them stood trial. The harshest sentence given in that trial was a mere 4 years' imprisonment, for theft. In another trial, the town's chief of police, Jan Zientara, was sentenced to eight years, for organizing robberies of German civilians.

In 1948, the reconstruction of the port of Świnoujście from martial to commercial and fishing began. The construction of a large fish farm began, a huge swimming pool and industrial buildings were built, and 3 years later the Fisheries Base was commissioned. Within three years, a large fish factory was established, managed by the independent Przedsiębiorstwo Usług Rybackie Odra in Świnoujście.

The port of Świnoujście was one of the three Polish ports through which Greeks and Macedonians, refugees of the Greek Civil War, reached Poland. The refugees were then transported to new homes in Poland, while wounded ones were sent to a nearby hospital on the Wolin island.

It was not until 27 November 1950, that the GDR government agreed to transfer to Poland the water intake for the city of Świnoujście, located at Lake Wolgastsee and demarcating the border there again. In June 1951, an area of 76.5 ha was incorporated into Poland together with a water treatment station, creating a characteristic promontory protruding into the German area (the so-called Worek, (53 54 49.11 N 14 11′11.18 E). In return, Germany was granted a similar area between the water intake and the Pomeranian Bay.

The spa part of the city was occupied by the Soviet Armed Forces until 1957, and until the turn of the 1980s and 1990s, there was a base of Soviet warships with facilities in Świnoujście. Until 1972, the city belonged to the Wolin poviat. In 1959, the "Uzdrowisko Świnoujście" State Enterprise was established. Currently Uzdrowisko Świnoujście S.A. belongs to the largest and most modern in Poland, and its greatest asset is still bromide-iodide-sodium brine discovered a hundred years ago.

In the 1960s and 1970s, a seaport was created, which together with Szczecin created a complex of ports Szczecin-Świnoujście. In 1964, ferry shipping to Scandinavia was resumed.

In 2015 the Świnoujście LNG terminal was opened, named after the late Polish President Lech Kaczyński, during whose presidency its construction was initiated.

Geography 
The city is located on the Strait of Świna, which in its northern part connects with the Baltic Sea, and in the south with the Szczecin Lagoon. It is situated on three inhabited islands: Usedom (35,712 inhabitants in 2010), Wolin (4,317 inhabitants), Karsibór (703 inhabitants) and 41 smaller uninhabited islands. Świnoujście is located in the northwestern edge of the West Pomeranian Voivodeship (with coordinates 53 ° 54′N 14 ° 14′E). Every year, the city's area increases by applying sand on the beach by sea currents.

Climate 
Świnoujscie is situated in the oceanic climate, which is characterized by mild winters and relatively cool summers. A very large influence on the climate of the city is the location of the Baltic Sea. Świnoujscie often in winter is the warmest city in Poland.

Population 
 1875: 7,977
 1880: 8,478
 1890: 8,508
 1900: 10,300
 1925: 18,352
 1933: 20,514
 1939: 26,593
 1947:  5,800
 1960: 17,000
 1970: 28,100
 1975: 42,400 (included Międzyzdroje)
 1980: 47,100
 1990: 43,300 (disconnected Międzyzdroje)
 1995: 43,361
 2000 - 43 697
 2001 - 43 351
 2002 - 41 542
 2003: 41,188
 2004: 41,098
 2005: 40,993
 2006: 41,100
 2007 - 40 871
 2008 - 40 829
 2009 - 40 765
 2010 - 40 759
 2012 - 41 516

Infrastructure

Transport 

The town is located on both banks of the river Świna, and since there is no road connection across it, transport is provided by regular ferries. Because the west section is otherwise wholly disconnected from the rest of Poland, this service is free of charge.  Under current plans, a road tunnel will be built under the river. The construction contract for it was signed in September 2018, with completion planned for September, 2022.

Świnoujście has the largest and most modern ferry terminal in Poland, with regular connections to Denmark and Sweden.  The city lies at the northern terminus of Polish National Route 3 (DK3, in the future express road S3), which is, in turn, part of the European route E65 running across Europe from Sweden to Greece.  Świnoujście has four railway stations on the eastern bank of the Świna, on Wolin island, with regular regional connections to Szczecin and long-distance connections to other cities in Poland (e.g. Poznań, Katowice, Bielsko-Biała, Kraków and Warszawa).

Land border controls were abolished 21 December 2007, and free automobile traffic to and from Germany was allowed for the first time since 1945, as Poland implemented the Schengen Agreement. From 20 September 2008, the city has a railway connection to its western portion as well, when the railway line to Ahlbeck was extended eastward to Świnoujście ("Świnoujście Centrum") giving it a direct link to the German railway network. The nearest airport with year-round traffic is the Szczecin-Goleniów "Solidarność" Airport,  to the southeast in Poland.

Tourist attractions 

 The former town hall houses the Museum of Deep Sea Fishing. Exhibits include the history of sea fishing, sea animals, the town and its region, and old navigation equipment.
 The Angel's Fort, built from 1845 to 1858, is a replica of Hadrian's Mausoleum (Castel Sant'Angelo in Rome).
 Concerts and art exhibitions are held at the Western Fort. Built between 1843 and 1863, it has been modernized a few times in the past. From after World War II until 1962 it was a headquarters of the Red Army.
 The 18th Christ the King Church in the centre of the town was erected on the site of a Gothic temple. A wooden ship replica is in the main nave. Organ concerts are presented during the summer.
 The Świnoujście Lighthouse, built in 1857, is at 68 m the highest lighthouse in Poland and on the Baltic Sea, and it is also the highest brick lighthouse in the world.
 The Stawa Młyny is a navigation beacon built in the form of a windmill on the 19th century breakwater.
 The neo-Gothic church of the Holy Mother "Stella Maris" has stained glass windows of great artistic value. It was erected at the end of the 19th century.
 The Eastern Fort, or Gerhard's Fort, is one of three preserved forts from the 19th century. It houses the Coastal Defense Museum (Muzeum Obrony Wybrzeża), with an exhibition which presents the history of the town's forts, as well as objects found there.
 The Spa Park (Park Zdrojowy) is a historic public park in the western part of the city.
 The "well" is a preserved tower of a Protestant church damaged during World War II and demolished afterwards.
 A shelter built in 1942 has the exposition "The town yesterday and now", presenting pictures of the town's history and other exhibits.
 The district of Karsibór contains an Evangelical cemetery established in the first half of 19th century.
 The Gothic church from the 15th century contains an altar from the 15th century and a pulpit from the 17th century.
 A monument honours the memory of Royal Air Force pilots shot down by the Germans while raiding the town in April 1945, located on the Karsibór island.
 Karsiborska Kępa, an island within the city limits, contains a bird sanctuary with approximately 140 species.

International relations

Twin towns – Sister cities 
Świnoujście is twinned with:
 Heringsdorf, Germany since 2007
 Nordenham, Germany since 1992
 Ostvorpommern, Germany since 1998
 Ystad, Sweden since 1990

Former twin towns
 Svetly, Russia since 1993 until 2022 (terminated due to the Russian invasion of Ukraine)

Districts of Świnoujście 
 Przytór
 Karsibór
 Wydrzany
 Łunowo
 Warszów
 Ognica

Sports 
 Flota Świnoujście – football club that competes in the lower leagues, but from 2008 to 2015 it played in the I liga (second tier)
 Prawobrzeże Świnoujście – football club that competes in the lower leagues
 A weekly free 5 km Parkrun takes place in Świnoujście.

Notable people 

 Theodor Fontane (1819–1898) German writer, lived here for several years as a child and described the town in his writings
 Alfred Ploetz (1860–1940) a German physician, biologist and eugenicist, coined the term racial hygiene
 Georg Kropp (1865–1943) a German journalist and polymath. He co-founded Germany's first mutual building society
 Elsa von Freytag-Loringhoven (1874–1927) a German avant-garde Dadaist artist and poet
 Christel Peters (1916–2009) a German actress
 Jürgen Harder (1918–1945) a German Luftwaffe fighter ace
 Hans-Werner Grosse (1922–2021) a German record-breaking glider pilot & Luftwaffe pilot
 Gisela Stein (1935–2009) a German actress
 Hans Jürgen Todt (born 1937) a German modern pentathlete, competed at the 1968 Summer Olympics
 Konrad Kwiet (born 1941) a historian and scholar of the Holocaust
 Jerzy Hausner (born 1949) a Polish politician, economist and member of the 4th Sejm
 Andrzej Smolik (born 1970) a Polish musician, composer, music producer and multi-instrumentalist
 Anna Harkowska (born 1980) a Polish cyclist, competed at the 1992 Summer Paralympics as a swimmer, and as a cyclist at the 2012 Summer Paralympics, where she won three silver medals.
 Michał Ruciak (born 1983) a Polish volleyball player, national volleyball team member

Cities and towns near Świnoujście 
 Szczecin (Poland)
 Międzyzdroje (Poland)
 Kamień Pomorski (Poland)
 Nowe Warpno (Poland)
 Ueckermünde (Germany)
 Ahlbeck (Germany)

See also 
 Dreikaiserbäder (Ahlbeck, Heringsdorf, and Bansin)
 Ports of the Baltic Sea

References

External links 

 Official website of Świnoujście 
 

 
Cities and towns in West Pomeranian Voivodeship
Port cities and towns in Poland
Port cities and towns of the Baltic Sea
City counties of Poland
Spa towns in Poland